The Mai Wah Museum is located in Butte, Montana, United States. Its mission is to document the history of Asian people in the Rocky Mountains. The museum is housed in the Wah Chong Tai building and Mai Wah Noodle Parlor building at 17 West Mercury Street.

History
Chin Hin Doon of the Chinn family relocated to America amidst famines and unrest in Guangdong province to start a new life in America. Chinn settled in Butte as a merchant in the Wah Chong Tai Company by 1894. By the 1930s, his son Albert Chinn who attended public schools in Butte ran the business out of the present Wah Chong Tai Mercantile and Mai Wah Noodle Parlor buildings, providing services and lodging to the local Chinese population. The Wah Chong Tai Mercantile, moved into the present building in 1899, now stands as the country's only original Chinese store from the early 20th century. Butte's Chinatown was once the largest between Minneapolis and Seattle. Now, the mercantile and adjoined Mai Wah Noodle Parlor exhibit 2,500 artifacts dating back to as early as 1905.  

In 2018, the Mai Wah Museum secured $133,000 through a Partners in Preservation grant to restore the exterior of the two buildings that make up the museum. The Partners in Preservation campaign highlighted sites that helped tell stories of diversity and of fights for equality. The online voting concluded with the Mai Wah Museum in the No. 6 position among 20 finalists.

See also 
 Pekin Noodle Parlor

References

External links
Mai Wah Society website

Chinese-American museums
Chinese-American culture in Montana
Ethnic museums in Montana
History museums in Montana
Museums in Butte, Montana
Restaurants in Montana